Spartanburg is a city in and the seat of Spartanburg County, South Carolina, United States. The city of Spartanburg has a municipal population of 38,732 as of the 2020 census, making it the 11th-largest city in the state. For a time, the Office of Management and Budget (OMB) grouped Spartanburg and Union Counties together as the Spartanburg metropolitan statistical area, but  the OMB now defines the Spartanburg MSA as only Spartanburg County.

Spartanburg is the second-largest city in the greater Greenville–Spartanburg–Anderson combined statistical area, which had a population of 1,385,045 as of 2014.

Spartanburg is the home of Wofford College, Converse University,  Spartanburg Community College, and Edward Via College of Ostepathic Medicine and the area is home to USC Upstate , Sherman College of Chiropratic and Spartanburg Methodist College. It is also the site of headquarters for Denny's. Spartanburg was ranked number 24 on the "150 Best Places to Live in the U.S. in 2021-2022" by US News & World Report.

History
Spartanburg was formed in 1785, after a deal was made with the Cherokee Nation in 1753, and was named after a local militia called the Spartan Regiment in the American Revolutionary War. The Spartan Regiment, commanded by Andrew Pickens, participated in the nearby Battle of Cowpens. In 1831, Spartanburg was incorporated, later becoming known as the "Hub City"; railroad lines radiated from the city forming the shape of a wheel hub.

It became a center of textile manufacturing in the late 19th century, with around 40 textile mills being established through the early 1900s.

In 1911, under the sponsorship of the Spartanburg Herald and the United Daughters of the Confederacy, the city erected a confederate monument at the intersection of South Church and Henry Streets, overlooking downtown. It was moved in 1966 to Duncan Park.

During World War I, Camp Wadsworth was used to train 100,000 soldiers for the war. Camp Croft trained soldiers during World War II. The facility was transferred to the state and adapted as Croft State Park.

By the 1950s, the production in these mills began to decline as wages increased. Most textile manufacturing jobs were moved offshore by the companies.

Geography

The most common soil series is Cecil. The bedrock is mostly biotite gneiss.

Climate
The city of Spartanburg has a humid subtropical climate with long, hot, and humid summers, and cool to semimild winters. In the summer from June through September, average highs are in the 80s °F (20s °C) to low 90s °F (30s °C), while in the winter, average highs are in the mid-50s °F (10s °C). Annual rainfall is spread fairly evenly throughout the whole year. Spartanburg receives very little snowfall, with the annual average being only .

Demographics

2010 census
As of the census of 2010, 37,013 people, 15,989 households, and 9,721 families were residing in the city. The population density was 2,066.3 people per square mile (799.9/km2). The 17,696 housing units had an average density of 923.9 per square mile (356.8/km2). The racial makeup was 49.55% African American, 47.15% White, 0.18% Native American, 1.33% Asian, 0.82% from other races, and 0.96% from two or more races. Hispanics or Latinos of any race were 1.78% of the population.

Of the 15,989 households, 28.9% had children under 18 living with them, 34.0% were married couples living together, 23.0% had a female householder with no husband present, and 39.2% were not families. About 34.0% of all households were made up of individuals, and 13.2% had someone living alone who was 65 or older. The average household size was 2.33, and the average family size was 3.00.

In the city, the age distribution was 25.2% under 18, 12.2% from 18 to 24, 26.6% from 25 to 44, 20.6% from 45 to 64, and 15.4% who were 65 or older. The median age was 35 years. For every 100 females, there were 79.6 males.

The median income for a household in the city was $28,735, and for a family was $36,108. Males had a median income of $30,587 versus $23,256 for females. The per capita income for the city was $18,136. About 29.4% of families and 23.3% of the population were below the poverty line, including 34.6% of those under age 18 and 15.4% of those age 65 or over.

2020 census

As of the 2020 United States census, e 38,732 people, 15,154 households, and 8,638 families resided in the city.

Economy
Within the past decade, developers and community leaders have spearheaded an effort to revitalize Spartanburg's downtown commercial district. This has resulted in a remodeling of Morgan Square, the restoration of a number of historic structures and the relocation of several businesses and company headquarters to the downtown vicinity. These new developments include a nine-floor, 240-room Marriott hotel.

Spartanburg is home to many large companies, including Denny's, KYMCO, Smith Drug Company, Advance America Cash Advance, Southern Conference, Spartanburg Herald-Journal, RJ Rockers Brewing Company, American Credit Acceptance, and Upward Sports.

The economy of Spartanburg benefits from the BMW manufacturing facility located in the city of Greer, South Carolina, which is in Spartanburg County. As of February 2017, the plant employed around 8,800 people with an average daily output of about 1,400 vehicles.

Spartanburg is also home to the world headquarters and research facility for Milliken & Company, a textile and chemical manufacturer.

Top employers
According to Spartanburg's 2015 Comprehensive Annual Financial Report, the principal employers in the city are:

Arts and culture

Cultural events and institutions in the city include:
The Chapman Cultural Center, Spartanburg's cultural anchor for history, art, theatre, dance, music, and science, is located in a three-building complex on the northern edge of downtown. Opened in October 2007, the Center was designed by David M. Schwarz Architects of Washington, D.C. It houses the Spartanburg Art Museum, Spartanburg County Regional History Museum, Science Center, Little Theatre, Ballet, Music Foundation, and other groups that were formerly located in The Arts Center on South Spring Street. It is owned and operated by The Arts Partnership of Greater Spartanburg, a non-profit organization dedicated to supporting arts and cultural agencies in Spartanburg County.
Hub City Writers Project, serves the community as a local publishing company and independent bookstore.
Converse University is a nationally known four-year liberal arts institution recognized for its strong music and visual art programs. It hosts events open to the community throughout the year. Twichell Auditorium is located on the campus of Converse University. Home of the Greater Spartanburg Philharmonic Orchestra, Twichell Auditorium has served as hosts to other groups such as the Spartanburg All-County High School Band and Boston Brass. Twichell Auditorium was built in 1899 and renovated for the school's centennial celebration in 1989. The 1500-seat auditorium is home to a 57-rank Casavant organ with 2,600+ pipes. Theatre Converse puts on several plays a year, and Converse puts on an opera annually, as well as opera scenes. The university has had major concerts in recent years with such artists as Caedmon's Call, Jason Mraz, Corey Smith, and Colbie Caillat.
Wofford College is a liberal arts college. Not traditionally known for its arts and cultural strength, Wofford has made notable strides to develop arts programs in recent years. Poet and environmental writer John E. Lane, theater artist Mark Ferguson, and visual artist Kris Neely are all graduates of Wofford. Each returned to their alma mater to develop curricular and co-curricular opportunities in the Arts, including a Creative Writing program, a Theatre Major, and a minor in Studio Art. John Lane was also a critical visionary in the creation of the Goodall Environmental Studies Center in Glendale, SC.
The Spartanburg County Public Library headquarters, housed in an innovative building on South Church Street, is home to a voluminous collection of fiction, nonfiction, children's literature, A/V materials and items relating to local history and genealogy. The library hosts many meetings, concerts and presentations. The County Librarian is Todd Stephens.
The Spartanburg Memorial Auditorium is located on N. Church Street, across from the municipal building in the northwest end of the city of Spartanburg. The "SMA" has hosted acts such as Bob Dylan, Crosby Stills and Nash, B.B. King, Billy Joel, David Copperfield, Lewis Grizzard, Harry Connick, Jr., Gerald Levert, Dave Chappelle, Jerry Seinfeld, Phish, A Prairie Home Companion, and many others. Originally built in an Art Deco style and was renovated c. 2002 including a new facade and backstage with loading area.

Points of interest
Lawson's Fork Creek, a tributary of the Pacolet River, was once known for its plentiful wildlife and crystal clear waters.  Parks and woodlands line much of its banks (which lie entirely within Spartanburg County), and rocky shoals and natural waterfalls can be found throughout its course.  It stretches from the northern end of the county to the eastern end, where it empties into the Pacolet.
The Cottonwood Trail is a walking trail located in the Edwin M. Griffin Nature Preserve that runs along part of Lawson's Fork Creek. The trail includes picnic areas, a raised path over an extensive wetlands area and access to sporadic sandbars. Located just east of downtown, it is used frequently by cyclists, joggers and walkers. Since the Lawson's Fork floodplain is not suitable for development, wildlife populate the area. Larger animals that can be found here include white-tailed deer, raccoons, wild turkeys, pileated woodpeckers, mallard ducks, Canada geese and snapping turtles.
Hatcher Garden and Woodland Preserve, is a preserve located in the midst of an urban environment. Retired social activist Harold Hatcher and his wife Josephine transformed an eroding gully into a thick woods and flower garden which now provides a haven for birds and other wildlife.

Early European settlers to this area included French fur trappers, English woodsmen, and Scots-Irish farmers. Few remnants survive from these early pioneering days, but traces can be found in the more rural areas of the county.

Walnut Grove Plantation, an 18th-century farmhouse, has been preserved by The Spartanburg County Historical Association. The site of a locally famous skirmish during the American Revolutionary War, it was the home of the Moore family. The plantation lies south of Spartanburg near the town of Roebuck, and is open to the public for tours and during annual festivals.
The Seay House, another 18th-century home, is a more typical representative of a pioneer home. Its single stone fireplace and simple construction were common traits of farmsteads from this period.
The Price House, the third 18th-century home maintained by the Historical Association, is unique. Its sturdy Flemish-bond brick construction and three stories are less common in this area. By carefully examining the original inventory lists of the house, the Historical Association has been able to retrieve period pieces that approximate the original contents of the house.

First established in the 1780s as a courthouse village, Spartanburg may have been named for the Spartan regiment of the South Carolina militia. The city was incorporated in 1831, at the time of the 50th anniversary of the Battle of Cowpens, a pivotal fight of the American Revolution that took place only a few miles away. The city's streets and architectural record reflect the changes of the 19th and 20th centuries.

Morgan Square, the city's primary downtown hub, is the original courthouse village. It was founded adjacent to a small spring (now underground) on the western slope of a ridge, which forms the border of the Tyger and Pacolet River watersheds. The square's name derives from Daniel Morgan, the general who commanded the American forces at Cowpens. A statue of Morgan was placed in the square in 1881. The oldest existing buildings on Morgan Square date to the 1880s.
The Magnolia Street Train Depot is one of the older buildings in Spartanburg and stands as a reminder of Spartanburg's old nickname "the Hub City," referring to the many transportation routes that connected Spartanburg with cities throughout the region. It is now the home of the Amtrak station, the Hub City Railroad Museum, and the Hub City Farmers' Market.
Hampton Heights Historic District is the city's oldest intact downtown neighborhood, located a couple of blocks south of Morgan Square. Architectural styles in this neighborhood range from large Queen Anne and Neoclassical homes to cozy early 20th-century bungalows.

Cotton mills have abounded in the Spartanburg area since 1816, earning Spartanburg the reputation as the "Lowell of the South." Although there were few mills in the area before the Civil War, technological advances, northern capital, and out-migration from the poor farms that made white labor available, created a wave of postbellum mill development here and in much of the Piedmont South. Additionally, the abundant streams and rivers in the area are just beginning their descent towards the lower-lying Midlands region. In many places, these waterways descend abruptly, providing a source for plentiful waterpower. Cotton mills were built along these rivers to harness this power, and so began the region's servitude to King Cotton. These mills, their owners and their slaves dominated the politics and economy of the region for nearly a century. Although nearly all abandoned, many mills remain along the riverbanks, the Piedmont equivalent of Gothic ruins.

Glendale Mill is located off Lawson's Fork Creek southeast of the city. Although gutted by fire in 2004, a few towers and smokestacks remain, providing a dramatic backdrop to the dam, shoals and waterfalls of the creek below. The former company store now serves as the home of the Wofford College Environmental Studies Center. The Glendale Shoals bridge will be getting a $600,000 makeover, and will ultimately connect to the state's Palmetto Trail.
Beaumont Mill, north of the downtown, has recently been purchased by Spartanburg Regional Healthcare who moved their billing, human resources, and medical records to the 180,000 square foot mill. The adjacent mill village has been designated as a local historic district.
Converse Mill is located east of the city along the Pacolet River. It has recently been purchased by a developer. The mill was reconstructed in 1903 after a huge flood washed away the original mill. The dam is still in use by Converse Energy Inc as a hydroelectric plant.

When the United States entered World War I in 1917, one of the sixteen divisional cantonments for the training of National Guard troops was Camp Wadsworth, which is located in the vicinity of Westgate Mall. Large numbers of New York National Guardsmen trained there in addition to many southern troops. During World War II, Camp Croft south of the city trained Army recruits. This is now a South Carolina state park with the same name. Some portions of the park contain the original quonset huts.

Attractions
The Hub City Farmers Market, an outdoor market held Saturday mornings from 8:00am – 12:00pm from April to December at Harvest Park in the Northside neighborhood, showcasing local (often organic) produce and goods.
Spring Fling, a weekend festival typically held the first Saturday of May, has many live artists, rides, and other assorted attractions.
Red, White and Boom, a Fourth of July event held at Barnet Park featuring patriotic music and a fireworks display.
The International Festival, an event showcasing culture and cuisine from countries around the globe held at Barnet Park on the first Saturday in October.
Music on Main, a street concert event held every Thursday (April through August) downtown.
The Greek Festival, a major street festival that is held in September by the local Greek community at St. Nicholas Greek Orthodox Church. The festival offers Greek food and cultural activities, and is the sister festival to the Greek Festival held every spring in Greenville.
Dickens of a Christmas, a Victorian holiday event held annually in downtown Spartanburg on the Tuesday after Thanksgiving.
Festifall, an historical celebration held on the grounds of the 18th-century Walnut Grove Plantation in October, featuring demonstrations and reenactments.
Taste of the Backcountry, a historical celebration held on the grounds of the 18th-century Price House in April, featuring food samples and demonstrations.
The Hub City Hog Fest is an annual barbecue festival and competition that benefits Mobile Meals. It is held in the heart of downtown Spartanburg with food trucks, over 40 BBQ teams, and two days of live music.
Hub City Railroad Museum
Spartanburg Music Trail which is a series of signs throughout downtown recognizing local musicians.
The Hotspot Skatepark
The Beacon Drive-In (Since 1946).

Sports

Spartanburg is host to the NFL's Carolina Panthers training camp each year on the campus of Wofford College.

Historic Duncan Park Stadium was once home to the Spartanburg Stingers in the Coastal Plain League and the Spartanburg Crickets in the Southern Collegiate Baseball League and is the oldest minor league baseball stadium in the country. It was also once home to the Spartanburg Phillies, a minor league team of the Philadelphia Phillies. It now is the home stadium for the baseball teams of Spartanburg High School and the Spartanburgers.

The Shrine Bowl of the Carolinas is held each year at Wofford's Gibbs Stadium. It is a high school football all-star game played between the top players from South Carolina and the top players from North Carolina.

The USC Upstate Spartans, Spartanburg Methodist College Pioneers, and the Wofford College Terriers offer a variety of sports for both men and women. Converse College also offers NCAA Division II women's sports teams.

The city hosts the Spartanburg Criterium. The criterium is a yearly event and is usually one of the events associated with Speed Week which is part of the USA Crits bicycle racing series. The event is billed as the “fastest night in Spartanburg.”

Upward Sports, a Christian-based sports organization for kids, is headquartered in Spartanburg.

Government
The current mayor, Jerome Rice, was elected in 2021. Spartanburg operates under a city manager form of government in which the mayor and six city council members have equal votes. Council members represent districts within the city and the mayor is elected at large. The council appoints a city manager, who is responsible for the daily administration of city governmental affairs. City Hall is located at 145 West Broad Street.

The Spartanburg County Administration Building (this is the old Sears building which was vacated in the mid-1970s when Sears moved to Westgate Mall and renovated in the late 1980s or early 1990s) is located at 366 North Church Street. It is across the street from the Spartanburg Memorial Auditorium.

Education

Colleges
Spartanburg is a college town, with four institutions of higher learning:
Spartanburg Community College
Converse University – Founded in 1889, Converse is a comprehensive doctoral institution.
Edward Via College of Osteopathic Medicine (VCOM) – Carolinas Campus. First classes began in Fall 2011.
Wofford College – Founded in 1854, Wofford is a Phi Beta Kappa liberal arts college with an enrollment of approximately 1,500 students.

In the area:
The University of South Carolina Upstate (formerly known as University of South Carolina Spartanburg, or USCS), in Valley Falls.
Spartanburg Methodist College – The only 2-year, private, residential college in the state, in Saxon
Sherman College of Chiropractic – South Carolina's only chiropractic college

Public and private schools
Most of the City of Spartanburg's public schools are run by Spartanburg County School District 7, one of seven loosely affiliated districts located in Spartanburg County. District 7 students are zoned to Spartanburg High School. However, the westernmost part of the city is served by Spartanburg County School District 6, which has two elementary schools within city limits. District 6 students are zoned to Paul M. Dorman High School in Roebuck.

The Spartanburg area is home to the main campus of the South Carolina School for the Deaf and the Blind, which is outside of the city limits in an unincorporated area. It has five Regional Outreach Centers throughout the state. The city is also home to Spartanburg Preparatory School, a K-8 public charter school that is the only "brick and mortar" charter school in the Upstate.

Spartanburg is also home to Spartanburg Christian Academy, a K-12 private school in North Spartanburg, the Spartanburg Day School, a K-12 private school offering the International Baccalaureate in grades K-4, and to Oakbrook Preparatory and Westgate Christian schools, both K-12 private schools. Located in Hampton Heights, the Montessori Academy of Spartanburg is a PreK-8 private school providing a Montessori educational approach. The Meeting Street Academy in downtown Spartanburg is a branch of a Charleston-based private school and currently offers PreK and Kindergarten.

St. Paul the Apostle Catholic School is located in downtown Spartanburg. It is affiliated with the Diocese of Charleston and is K-8.

Media
 Spartanburg's primary newspaper is the Spartanburg Herald-Journal, owned by Gannett. The Herald-Journal also publishes Spartanburg magazine four times per year. 
 The Post and Courier of Charleston, operates a bureau in Spartanburg, and publishes a Spartanburg e-edition and Spartanburg news online.  
 The Spartan Weekly News is a weekly newspaper with offices located in downtown Spartanburg. The paper covers all of Spartanburg County with an emphasis on the city of Spartanburg, and its coverage focuses on items of community interest and well as news from around the upstate of South Carolina.
 "The Greer Citizen" publishes online and weekly in print
 "The Woodruff Times" publishes online 

Spartanburg is part of the much greater Greenville-Spartanburg-Anderson-Asheville DMA which is the nation's 38th largest and is served by the following major television affiliates:

WYFF 4 (NBC), broadcasting from Greenville, SC
WSPA 7 (CBS), broadcasting from Spartanburg
WLOS 13 (ABC), broadcasting from Asheville, NC but also from Anderson, SC on WMYA DT-2 (a digital subchannel)
WGGS 16 independent/Christian Television Station
WHNS 21 (Fox), broadcasting from Greenville, SC
WMYA 40 (My Network TV), transmitting from Anderson, SC but also on WLOS DT-2 a digital subchannel of Channel 13 out of Asheville, NC
WYCW 62 (The CW Network), licensed to Asheville but broadcasting and transmitting from Spartanburg

Infrastructure

Transportation

Major highways

  Interstate 85
  Business Loop 85
  Interstate 26
  Interstate 585
  U.S. Route 176
  U.S. Route 29
  U.S. Route 221
  South Carolina 9
  South Carolina 295
  South Carolina 56
  South Carolina 296
  South Carolina 215
  South Carolina 129

Public transit

Spartanburg is served by the Spartanburg Area Regional Transit Agency (SPARTA), covering the city of Spartanburg and the surrounding urbanized area with 8 routes leading to a wide variety of destinations. All SPARTA buses are equipped with bicycle racks. Two hybrid-electric buses were added to the fleet in 2012. The SPARTA Passenger Center is located at 100 North Liberty Street and also serves Greyhound buses.

Mass Transit is provided to all citizens of Spartanburg County through Spartanburg County Dial-A-Ride. It is a door to door service that operates six days a week.

Airports
The Greenville-Spartanburg International Airport (GSP) lies mostly in suburban Greer, and it serves Greenville as well as Spartanburg. It has become one of the busiest airports in South Carolina.

The Spartanburg Downtown Memorial Airport (SPA) is a general aviation/small craft airport owned and operated by the City, which lies southwest of town.

Railroad station
Amtrak's Crescent train connects Spartanburg with the cities of New York, Philadelphia, Baltimore, Washington, Greensboro, Charlotte, Atlanta, Birmingham and New Orleans. The Amtrak station is situated at 290 Magnolia Street.

Healthcare
Spartanburg County's healthcare is mainly provided by Spartanburg Regional Healthcare System. Spartanburg Regional is a public, not-for-profit, integrated health care delivery system with several facilities in Spartanburg, including:

 Spartanburg Medical Center (SMC), a research and teaching hospital with two locations: Spartanburg Medical Center campus on East Wood Street and Spartanburg Medical Center — Mary Black Campus on Skylyn Drive. Together, these campuses share a history that stretches back to the 1920s. Spartanburg Medical Center includes a total of 747 beds, and services that include emergency, surgical, maternity, cancer, a Heart Center and inpatient rehabilitation.
 Spartanburg Hospital for Restorative Care (SHRC), a 97-bed long-term, acute-care hospital with a 25-bed skilled nursing facility.
 Gibbs Cancer Center & Research Institute, providing an inpatient oncology unit and outpatient care, along with access to clinical trials and the latest cancer technology.
 Bearden-Josey Center for Breast Health, a state-of-the-art imaging center for digital mammography, ultrasound, stereotactic breast biopsy and bone densitometry.
 Medical Group of the Carolinas, a physician group with offices located throughout Spartanburg and Upstate S.C.

Notable people

Ted Alexander (1912–1999), baseball pitcher in Negro leagues
Pink Anderson (1900–1974), blues musician; inspiration for the "Pink" in Pink Floyd
Norman C. Armitage (1907, as Norman Cudworth Cohn–1972), Olympic medalist saber fencer who lived in Spartanburg, S. C., and in honor of whom the Milliken company plant in Spartanburg County was named.
David Ball (born 1953), country musician
Joe Bennett, lead singer and guitarist from the 1950s rock 'n roll band "Joe Bennett and the Sparkletones"
Ted Bogan (1909–1990), country blues guitarist, singer and songwriter.
Red Borom (1915-2011), Major League Baseball infielder for Detroit Tigers
Emma L. Bowen, healthcare and media activist
Mike Bullman, bandleader, lead singer and guitarist with Jesters III
James Francis Byrnes (1882–1972), lawyer, congressman, senator, Supreme Court Justice, advisor to FDR, Secretary of State to Truman, Governor of South Carolina
Wilson Casey (born 1954), syndicated newspaper columnist, speaking entertainer, and Guinness World Record holder
Mark Cerney (born 1967), founder Next of Kin Registry (NOKR)
Marshall Chapman (born 1949), singer-songwriter
Jeremy Clements (born 1985), racing driver
Landon Cohen (b 1986), football player, community-builder
Fieldin Culbreth (Born 1963), Major League Baseball umpire, Olympian
David Daniels (born 1966), counter-tenor
Stephen Davis (born 1974), football running back
 Steven Duggar (born 1993), baseball player for the San Francisco Giants
Marion Kirkland Fort (1921–1964), mathematician
Art Fowler (1922–2007), pitcher and pitching coach in Major League Baseball
Grace Beacham Freeman (1916–2002), poet, columnist, short story writer; South Carolina Poet Laureate 1985–86
Hank Garland (1930–2004), legendary Nashville guitarist who accompanied Patsy Cline and Elvis, among others
George Gray (aka One Man Gang) (born 1960), Pro wrestler
Fred Griffith (born 1964), American actor and film producer
Mark Hammond (born 1963), South Carolina Secretary of State
Lee Haney (born 1951), eight-time Mr. Olympia record holder
Dennis Hayes (born 1950), inventor of the Hayes modem
Heath Hembree (born 1989), baseball player
Adam Humphries (born 1993), NFL wide receiver
Walter Hyatt (1950–1996), country musician and songwriter
Joseph T. Johnson (1858–1919), United States Representative from South Carolina
Marcus Lattimore, football player
Donald Lawrence (born 1961), Gospel artist
Fred L. Lowery (born 1943), Southern Baptist clergyman, televangelist, and Christian author; former pastor of First Baptist Church of North Spartanburg
Leigh Magar, milliner and business owner
The Marshall Tucker Band, Southern rock band featuring George McCorkle, Doug Gray, Jerry Eubanks, Toy Caldwell, Tommy Caldwell, and Paul Riddle
Marcus McBeth (born 1980), baseball player
Roger Milliken (1915–2010), billionaire owner of the largest privately held textile manufacturing firm in the world (Milliken & Company)
Bud Moore (1925–2017), NASCAR team owner/crew chief
D. J. Moore (born 1987), football player
Kris Neely (born 1978), artist and educator
Samuel J. Nicholls (1885–1937), United States Representative from South Carolina
Angela Nikodinov (born 1980), U.S. figure skater
Cotton Owens (1924–2012), NASCAR team owner/crew chief
David Pearson (1934–2018), NASCAR champion
Kitty Black Perkins (born 1948), Chief Designer of Fashions for Barbie, designer of the "First Black Barbie"
Arthur Prysock (1929–1997), jazz singer
Betsy Rawls (born 1928), pro golfer, member of World Golf Hall of Fame, born in Spartanburg
Mike Reid (born 1970), NFL player
Gianna Rolandi (1952–2021), operatic soprano
Al "Flip" Rosen (1924–2015), MLB 4-time All-Star third baseman and first baseman, MVP, 2-time home run champion, 2-time RBI leader
Donald S. Russell (1906–1998), former South Carolina governor, president of the University of South Carolina, US Senator, and member of the US 4th Circuit Court of Appeals
Archibald Rutledge (1883–1973), South Carolina poet laureate, resided in Spartanburg for about 20 years
Jack Smith (1924–2001), NASCAR driver
Carey Wentworth Styles, founder of the Atlanta Constitution 
Gina Tolleson, Miss South Carolina USA 1990, First runner-up Miss USA 1990, Miss World 1990 
Wayne Tolleson (born 1955), baseball player
Sandra L. Townes (1944–2018), United States District Court judge
Buck Trent (born 1938), country music instrumentalist who accompanied Porter Wagoner & Dolly Parton, among others
Ira Tucker (1925–2008), lead singer of the influential gospel group the Dixie Hummingbirds
William "Singing Billy" Walker (1809–1875), compiler of shape note tunebooks, including The Southern Harmony, and Musical Companion.
Celia Weston (born 1951), actress
Zion Williamson (born 2000), men's basketball player currently playing for New Orleans Pelicans, and formerly for Duke

Gallery

See also 
 List of municipalities in South Carolina

References

Further reading
 Cooper, Peter (1997). Hub City Music Makers. Spartanburg, S.C.: Holocene Publishing. .
 Landrum, J.B.O. (1900). History of Spartanburg County.
 Racine, Philip N. (1999). Seeing Spartanburg. Spartanburg, S.C.: Hub City Writers Project. .
 Racine, Philip N. Living a Big War in a Small Place: Spartanburg, South Carolina, during the Confederacy (Univ of South Carolina Press, 2013).
 Teter, Betsy Wakefield (Ed.) (2002). Textile Town: Spartanburg, South Carolina. Spartanburg, S.C.: Hub City Writers Project. . Pp. 346. 40 authors provide a detailed community study, using oral histories, letters, and 200 illustrations and photographs. Central themes include labor strikes, family life in the mill villages, Depression-era hardships, race and desegregation, the boom of WW2 production, and late-twentieth-century deindustrialization.
 WPA (1939). History of Spartanburg County.

External links

 
 
 Spartanburg Tourism Commission

 
Cities in South Carolina
Cities in Spartanburg County, South Carolina
County seats in South Carolina
Populated places established in 1831
1831 establishments in South Carolina